Arthur Theodor Olsen (15 December 1900 – 8 December 1951) was a Norwegian boxer who competed in the 1920 Summer Olympics. He died in Bergen. In 1920 he was eliminated in the second round of the featherweight class after losing his fight to the upcoming silver medalist Jean Gachet.

References

External links
 profile

1900 births
1951 deaths
Featherweight boxers
Olympic boxers of Norway
Boxers at the 1920 Summer Olympics
Sportspeople from Bergen
Norwegian male boxers
20th-century Norwegian people